Tonight and the Rest of My Life is the debut album from Veruca Salt co-founder, Nina Gordon. The album was recorded with Bob Rock at his Maui recording studio.

Track listing
All songs written by Nina Gordon, except where noted.

Personnel
Nina Gordon - electric guitar, acoustic guitar, vocals
Bob Rock - electric guitar, acoustic guitar, bass guitar
Jim Shapiro - electric guitar, acoustic guitar, mellotron
Jon Brion - electric guitar, acoustic guitar, pedal steel, bass guitars, organ, chamberlin
John Webster - acoustic guitar, Wurlitzer electric piano, chamberlin, mellotron, organ
Scott Riebling - bass guitar
Stacy Jones - electric guitar, acoustic guitar, drums, percussion

Chart performance
The album peaked at #123 on the Billboard 200 chart, remaining on the chart for 10 weeks. The album also peaked at number one on Billboard's Heatseekers Albums chart, remaining for 26 weeks and into 2001. The album was very popular in the Northeast, staying on Billboard's Northeast Heatseekers chart for 16 weeks. "Tonight and the Rest of My Life" was played very heavily on Adult Top 40 and Top 40 radio stations throughout the Northeast. It stayed on Billboard's Pacific Heatseekers chart for 8 weeks, Billboard's West North Central Heatseekers chart for 13 weeks, Billboard's Mountain Heatseekers chart for 14 weeks, and Billboard's Middle Atlantic Heatseekers chart for 9 weeks. The album went on to sell 350,000 copies in America.

Singles

In 2000, "Tonight and the Rest of My Life" peaked at #7 on Billboard's Adult Top 40 chart. It also peaked at #9 on Billboard's Adult Top 40 Recurrent chart. The single charted on Billboard's Bubbling Under Hot 100 Singles chart in September 2000 for 4 weeks and was played on pop radio heavily in the late summer/early fall of 2000. MTV and VH1 put the video for "Tonight and the Rest of My Life" into constant rotation around the same time.  In Australia, "Tonight and the Rest of My Life" peaked at #123 on the ARIA singles chart.

In 2001, "Now I Can Die" peaked at #29 on Billboard's Adult Top 40 chart and remained on the chart for 10 weeks. VH1 also played the music video.

Non-album tracks
These tracks were recorded for the album but were not included in the final release.
"Alone With You"
"Black and Blonde (Original Edit)"
"Like It Happens Everyday"
"Unsafe At Any Speed"

These can be heard on Gordon's official website, and "Alone With You" can be found on the compilation album Abrazos 2005.

Tonight and the Rest of My Life was recorded while Gordon was signed to Outpost Records, a label owned by Geffen Records, following her departure from Veruca Salt in 1998. In 1999, Outpost Records folded and Gordon was left without a label. Shortly after, she was signed to Warner Bros. Records.

The original Tonight and the Rest of My Life track list on Outpost Records was:

"Tonight and the Rest of My Life" (Gordon) – 5:15
"Now I Can Die" (Gordon) – 3:07
"2003" (Gordon) – 4:05
"Badway" (Gordon) – 3:08
"Horses in the City" (Gordon) – 4:08
"Hold on to Me" (Gordon) – 4:05
"New Year's Eve" (Gordon) – 3:28
"Fade to Black" (Gordon) – 4:07
"Number One Camera" (Gordon) – 2:58
"Got Me Down" (Gordon) – 4:05
"Black and Blonde" (Gordon) – 4:23
"Too Slow To Ride" (Gordon) – 3:49
"Hate Your Way" (Gordon) – 4:46

"Black and Blonde" was removed from the album because Gordon felt it was a mean song about someone she didn't want to be mean to anymore. "The End of the World," a last-minute recording Gordon did while recording with then boyfriend Stacy Jones' band American Hi-Fi, replaced it. A new recording of this song with revised lyrics was included on Ghost Notes, the 2015 album by the reunited Gordon/Post/Lack/Shapiro lineup of Veruca Salt.

The singles for Tonight and the Rest of My Life also changed numerous times. When Outpost Records was in the initial stages of promoting the album (and Gordon), they stated that the first single would be "Horses in the City." After Gordon moved to Warner Bros. Records, promo singles were circulated for the song "Now I Can Die" the March before the album's June 27 release date. One month later, she stated that the first single would be "Tonight and the Rest of My Life," which shortly after was released as the first single from the album.

"Hold on to Me" and "Now I Can Die" were the lead contenders for second single, but "2003" and "Got Me Down" were also being considered.

References

2000 debut albums
Nina Gordon albums
Albums produced by Bob Rock
Warner Records albums